Ngaliwurru may be,

Ngaliwurru people
Ngaliwurru language